Dolfini is an Italian surname. Notable people with the surname include:

Angelo Dolfini (born 1978), Italian figure skater
Giovanni Dolfini (1885–1968), Italian actor

See also
Dolfin (disambiguation)

Italian-language surnames